The Northeastern Jiangxi Soviet was a constituent part of the Chinese Soviet Republic (1931 - November 1935). Any military threat it posed to the Nationalist Party-controlled Chinese State (1927–1949) had been roundly neutered by an early 1931 campaign (while it was still known as the North-eastern Jiangxi Revolutionary Base Area), and thus the area was never going to make a formidable component soviet of the CSR.

Geography 
The administrative centre or Soviet capital was at the town of Geyuan in northern Hengfeng County, now in Shangrao. The town was taken rather unceremoniously by the Chinese army in 1934.

The counties under sustained CPC-affiliated control all lie in the present-day municipality of Shangrao, Jiangxi; intermittently affected counties now lie in Quzhou, Zhejiang, and Nanping, Fujian.

Northeastern Jiangxi Soviet in the Second Sino-Japanese War 
In 1938, the Nationalist Party government conducted an eradication campaign into the area which put an end to whatever small harassments the remnant Soviet troops had been able to stage against the war effort. Little better than a rural fugitive, the Soviet leader Yang Wenhan lived jianghu (江湖, the classic Chinese outlaw life) until his capture in 1943. Yang was held by the Nationalists for seven months before his execution.

Former socialist republics
Chinese Soviet Republic
States and territories established in 1931